Konstantinos Tzanes (1633 – 1685; also known as Bounialis  Konstantinos Tzane-Bounialis, Konstantinos Zane, or Konstantinos Tzane) was a Greek Renaissance painter.  He was a painter in Crete and Venice.  His brother Emmanuel Tzanes was the parish priest of the church of San Giorgio dei Greci.  Emmanuel Tzanes was also a famous painter and author.  Konstantinos followed the Venetian style and in some instances completely broke from the maniera greca.  His other brother Marinos Tzanes was a famous poet. Konstantinos's work influenced both Greek and Italian Painters.  His most popular work is the painting by Mary Magdalene which is at the Greek Institute in Venice.

History
Tzanes was born in Rethymno.  His older brothers were both artists.  His one brother was the painter Emmanuel Tzanes.  His other brother was the poet Marinos Tzanes.  Konstantinos migrated to Venice with his brother around 1655. Around this period Greek painters Ioannis Moskos and Leos Moskos were also present in Venice.  Konstantinos married Kalitsa or Kali. They had three children Emmanuel, George, and Antonia.  His children were baptized by the painter and priest Philotheos Skoufos at San Giorgio dei Greci.  According to the church records of Saint Antonios Parish, his wife died on March 7, 1663.  She was forty years old. 

Konstantinos paid for the publication of the Sequence of Saint Joseph.  It was written by his brother Emmanuel.  The two brothers continued to flourish in Venice.  Emmanuel Tzanes replaced Philotheos Skoufos as the priest of San Giorgio dei Greci.  Philotheos Skoufos  returned to Zakynthos in 1665, the Venetian State granted him the monastery of Panagia Laurentaina.  Konstantinos died around 1685.  Emmanuel Tzanes was the presiding priest at the wedding of Konstantinos's daughter Antonia in 1685.  She was Emmanuel's niece.  She was married at San Giorgio dei Greci.

Konstantinos Tzanes's artwork was very popular. Emmanuel Tzanes and his brother Konstantinos had a very good reputation.  A huge catalog still exists representing both brothers.  They are both considered members of the Cretan Renaissance and both were influenced by the Venetian style.  Gregory Maras a prominent priest from Crete donated one of Konstantinos's works to San Giorgio dei Greci.  Konstantinos's art can be found all over the world in private collections, museums, and churches.  There are 21 existing paintings attributed to Tzanes.

Gallery

Notable works
Saints of the 22nd of January Greek Institute in Venice
St Catherine and eight representations of scenes from her life and martyrdom Benaki Museum Athina 
The Virgin Vrefokratousa enthroned Cathedral of Saint James and Saint Christopher, Corfu, Greece
Mary Magdalene (Tzanes)

References

Bibliography

1633 births
1685 deaths
Cretan Renaissance painters
17th-century Greek people
17th-century Greek painters
People from Rethymno (regional unit)
Greek Renaissance humanists
Greek Baroque painters
Painters of the Heptanese School